Full Speed (Italian: Tempo massimo) is a 1934 Italian comedy film directed by Mario Mattoli and starring Vittorio De Sica, Milly and Camillo Pilotto.

It was shot at the Cines Studios in Rome. The film's sets were designed by the art director Gastone Medin.

Synopsis
A mild-mannered young Professor's quiet life in the country is turned upside down one day when, while out fishing, Dora lands in the water beside him having parachuted out of a plane. Dora is a vivacious party girl, who quickly disrupts the Professor's stuffy household. His growing attraction to her is tempered by the fact that she is due to be married soon.

In popular culture
The final scene showing Giacomo and Dora, after having avoided the "wrong" marriage, in the back of the bus as it travels down the road, is practically the same scene as the ending of Mike Nichols's The Graduate.

Main cast
Vittorio De Sica as Giacomo 
Milly as Dora Sandri 
Camillo Pilotto as Maggiordomo 
Enrico Viarisio as Alfredo Martinelli 
Amelia Chellini as Zia Agata 
Anna Magnani as Emilia
Nerio Bernardi as Il principe Huerta - detto Bob 
Ermanno Roveri as Jack 
Giulio Donadio as Rossi - l'usuraio

References

Bibliography
 Moliterno, Gino. The A to Z of Italian Cinema. Scarecrow Press, 2009.

External links 
 

1934 films
Commedia all'italiana
Italian black-and-white films
1930s Italian-language films
1934 comedy films
Films directed by Mario Mattoli
1934 directorial debut films
Italian comedy films
Cines Studios films
1930s Italian films